Mount Matsurai, natively known as Gunung Masurai, is a large complex of inactive stratovolcanoes in Jambi, Sumatra, Indonesia.

Geology
Mount Masurai is part of the greater Barisan Mountains, which formed due to offshore subduction of the Indo-Australian Plate beneath the Sunda Plate along the Sunda megathrust. The volcanic comples is situated in the Sungai Penuh pull-apart basin; caused by offsets along two segments of the Great Sumatran Fault. In the southern section of the basin, closer to Mount Masurai, the basin becomes wider.

Mount Matsurai contains two crater lakes; Kumbang Lake and Merbuk Lake; near the summit cone. The summit cone occupies the western remnant of a half-caldera, 7 km in diameter. The rim of the half-caldera is at an altitude of –. A third lake, Blue Lake, located in the caldera, is thought to be remnants of a parasitic eruption; one of many around the area.

Flora
Two species of tropical carnivorous pitcher plants; Nepenthes spathulata and Nepenthes singalana notably overlap each other. The plants, which cannot be definitively assigned to either appear intermediate in form between these two species. It was discovered by botanist Charles Clarke, and written in his monograph Nepenthes of Sumatra and Peninsular Malaysia.

Climbing
Kumbang Lake is a popular feature of the volcano, often visited by climbers on their way to the summit.

See also

 List of volcanoes in Indonesia

References

Volcanoes of Sumatra
Stratovolcanoes of Indonesia
Volcanic crater lakes
Mountains of Sumatra
Landforms of Jambi
Pleistocene stratovolcanoes